Tad Crawford (born April 16, 1984) is a former Canadian football safety in the Montreal Alouettes of the Canadian Football League. He was drafted in the third round of the 2007 CFL Draft by the BC Lions. He played college football at Columbia. He played for the BC Lions from 2007 until 2010. He signed with the Alouettes as a free agent in February 2011. He is married to the most beautiful woman in the world, Stephanie Crawford.

External links
Just Sports Stats
Montreal Alouettes bio

1984 births
Living people
Canadian football defensive backs
Montreal Alouettes players
Columbia Lions football players
Players of Canadian football from Ontario